Charles Goodrich Nevitt (born June 13, 1959) is an American former professional basketball player, known primarily for his great height. At 7 ft 5 in (2.26 m), he played the center position throughout his nine-year career (1983, 1985–1990, 1992, 1993) in the NBA, and remains one of the tallest players ever in NBA history. During his career, Nevitt played with the Houston Rockets, Los Angeles Lakers, Detroit Pistons, Chicago Bulls, Fulgor Libertas Forlì (Italy), and San Antonio Spurs.

Early life
Nevitt attended Sprayberry High School in Marietta, Georgia, and played college basketball at North Carolina State University. In college, he played 90 games over four seasons, averaging 3.0 points and 2.4 rebounds per game.

NBA career
He was selected in the third round of the 1982 NBA draft by the Houston Rockets, subsequently playing 15 games with the Los Angeles Lakers over 2 seasons.

After leaving the Lakers for the Pistons, Nevitt was on the roster of the Chuck Daly-coached team that lost to the Lakers in seven games in the 1988 NBA Finals.

After a return to the Rockets, he also appeared for the Michael Jordan-led Bulls (during a 1991–92 10-day contract), and played one game with the Spurs – the 1993-94 season opener – on November 5, in which he made 3-of-6 free throws in less than a minute against the Golden State Warriors. He was released shortly thereafter, never to reappear in an NBA game.

Nevitt played in the NBA for nine seasons, appearing in 155 games. He played a total of 826 minutes (5.3 minutes per game). He played in 16 playoff games across five postseasons: seven each with the Lakers and Pistons, and two with the Rockets. Nevitt was a member of the 1985 Lakers' championship team, and is the tallest NBA player to ever win an NBA Championship.

Post-NBA and personal life
Nevitt is married to Sondra Childers and has a sister, Lynne, who is also a basketball player. He worked at NetApp in the research triangle park in NC performing computer networking functions.

Nevitt went by the nicknames Chuck E. Cheese and the Human Victory Cigar

NBA career statistics

Regular season

|-
|style="text-align:left;"|
|style="text-align:left;"|Houston
|6||0||10.7||.733||–||.250||2.8||.0||.2||2.0||3.8
|-
|style="text-align:left;background:#afe6ba;"|†
|style="text-align:left;"|L.A. Lakers
|11||0||5.4||.294||–||.250||1.8||.3||.0||1.4||1.1
|-
|style="text-align:left;"|
|style="text-align:left;"|L.A. Lakers
|4||0||6.3||.273||–||.667||1.8||.5||.5||.5||2.5
|-
|style="text-align:left;"|
|style="text-align:left;"|Detroit
|25||0||4.0||.375||–||.750||1.0||.2||.1||.7||1.6
|-
|style="text-align:left;"|
|style="text-align:left;"|Detroit
|41||0||6.5||.492||–||.583||2.0||.1||.2||.7||1.9
|-
|style="text-align:left;"|
|style="text-align:left;"|Detroit
|17||0||3.7||.333||–||.500||1.1||.0||.1||.3||1.0
|-
|style="text-align:left;"|
|style="text-align:left;"|Houston
|43||0||5.3||.435||–||.688||1.5||.1||.1||.7||1.5
|-
|style="text-align:left;"|
|style="text-align:left;"|Houston
|3||0||3.0||1.000||–||–||1.0||.3||.0||.3||1.3
|-
|style="text-align:left;"|
|style="text-align:left;"|Chicago
|4||0||2.3||.333||–||–||.3||.3||.0||.0||.5
|-
|style="text-align:left;"|
|style="text-align:left;"|San Antonio
|1||0||1.0||–||–||.500||1.0||.0||.0||.0||3.0
|- class=sortbottom
|style="text-align:center;" colspan=2|Career
|155||0||5.3||.438||–||.589||1.5||.1||.1||.7||1.6

Playoffs

|-
|style="text-align:left;background:#afe6ba;"| 1985†
|style="text-align:left;"|L.A. Lakers
|7||0||5.3||.333||–||.500||.9||.1||.6||.9||1.4
|-
|style="text-align:left;"|1986
|style="text-align:left;"|Detroit
|1||0||1.0||–||–||–||.0||.0||.0||.0||.0
|-
|style="text-align:left;"|1987
|style="text-align:left;"|Detroit
|3||0||3.3||.200||–||1.000||2.0||.0||.0||1.0||1.3
|-
|style="text-align:left;"|1988
|style="text-align:left;"|Detroit
|3||0||1.3||.500||–||–||1.0||.0||.0||.0||.7
|-
|align=left|1989
|align=left|Houston
|2||0||1.5||–||–||–||.5||.0||.0||.0||.0
|- class="sortbottom"
|style="text-align:center;" colspan=2|Career
|16||0||3.4||.313||–||.600||1.0||.1||.3||.6||1.0

See also
List of tallest players in National Basketball Association history

References

External links
NBA statistics at Basketball-Reference
CBA statistics at justsportsstats.com
College statistics at Sports-Reference

1959 births
Living people
American men's basketball players
Basketball players from Colorado
Basketball players from Marietta, Georgia
Capital Region Pontiacs players
Chicago Bulls players
Centers (basketball)
Detroit Pistons players
Houston Rockets draft picks
Houston Rockets players
Los Angeles Lakers players
NC State Wolfpack men's basketball players
People from Cortez, Colorado
Rapid City Thrillers players
San Antonio Spurs players